The 1977 All-Ireland Senior Club Camogie Championship for the leading clubs in the women's team field sport of camogie was won by Athenry from Galway, who defeated Portglenone from Antrim in the final, played at Athenry .

Arrangements
The championship was organised on the traditional provincial system used in Gaelic Games since the 1880s, with Ballyagran defeating Drom & Inch and Éire Óg from Cork to win the Munster championship and St Paul’s winning the Leinster championship. Athenry drew their strength from the successful local Presentation Convent team, and were Connacht champions for the third year in succession.

The Final
Athenry’s overwhelming victory was certain from the start of the final and they led 5-4 to 0-1 at half-time and they maintain control in the second half against the breeze. Theresa Duane and Anne Morris scored four goals each. Agnes Hourigan wrote in the Irish Press: Excellent defensive work by Noreen Tracey, Anne Duane and Anne Delaney kept the Ulster champions at bay throughout and the winners forwards continued to score virtually at will. Particularly prominent were Olive Coady on the wing and Midge Pionard at centrefield.

Final stages

References

External links
 Camogie Association

1977 in camogie
1977
Cam